Josef Koukl (8 November 1926 in Brno – 22 May 2010 in Litoměřice) was the Roman Catholic bishop of the Roman Catholic Diocese of Litoměřice, Czech Republic.

Ordained to the priesthood on 23 April 1950, Koukl was appointed bishop of the Litoměřice Diocese by Pope John Paul II and was consecrated on 27 August 1989, retiring on 24 December 2003.

Notes

1926 births
2010 deaths
20th-century Roman Catholic bishops in the Czech Republic
Clergy from Brno
People from Litoměřice
21st-century Roman Catholic bishops in the Czech Republic